Iron Man Experience (Traditional Chinese: 鐵甲奇俠飛行之旅) is a 3-D motion simulator attraction in Tomorrowland at Hong Kong Disneyland, which opened on 11 January 2017. The attraction is based on the Marvel Cinematic Universe character Iron Man, becoming the first Disney attraction to be based on a Marvel property. Set at the fictional Stark Expo, the attraction features Tony Stark recruiting guests to fend off extraterrestrial beings that are attacking Hong Kong.

History

Discussions of creating Marvel attractions at Walt Disney Parks and Resorts' theme parks began in 2009, with The Walt Disney Company's acquisition of Marvel Entertainment. In his 2013-14 budget speech, Hong Kong's financial secretary John Tsang announced that a new nighttime parade as well as a themed area featuring characters from the Marvel Universe would be built in Hong Kong Disneyland. On 8 October 2013, Walt Disney Parks and Resorts chairman Thomas O. Staggs announced that Hong Kong Disneyland would be adding the Iron Man Experience. Walt Disney Imagineering designed the attraction and Industrial Light & Magic created the computer-generated visual effects. Due to the construction of Iron Man Experience, Hong Kong Disneyland Railroad was suspended from 17 February 2014, until 29 June 2015, and the Fastpass service of Buzz Lightyear Astro Blasters was suspended until late 2016. Testing for the ride began in May 2019.

Attraction
The attraction is estimated to have a cost of $100 million and employs a newer generation model of the Advanced Technology Leisure Application Simulator, currently used in Star Tours – The Adventures Continue. The attraction is located at the park's Tomorrowland section, in an area named "Stark Expo", adjacent to Buzz Lightyear Astro Blasters. Set a few years after the 2010 New York Stark Expo, Tony invites the visitors aboard the Iron Wing for a tour of Hong Kong, including the newly constructed Stark Tower. However, Hydra launches an attack on the city, led by Dr. Arnim Zola, forcing Tony to don the Iron Man armor and fight the menace alongside the Iron Wing.

Stark Expo
Arriving visitors enter the Stark Expo, where they can learn the history of Howard Stark, the founder of Stark Industries, before meeting current president Tony Stark, who is introducing a new invention known as the "Iron Wing". At the expo, guests can experience the history of Stark Industries through inventions by Howard Stark, and into the present day, where Tony Stark is inspiring his team of scientists and engineers to make our lives better, more convenient and safer through technology. At the back of the area, guests can enter the simulator attraction.

Ride
The Ride begins when J.A.R.V.I.S. attempts to fly out of the park to see Stark Tower in Hong Kong. He later realizes that Hydra is using Giant Robots to try and steal the Arc Reactor on the Hong Kong Stark Tower. Jarvis calls Stark and tells him the news. Stark (voiced by Mick Wingert) arrives at the scene and attacks the Hydra robots and attempts to fly Jarvis and the guests back to the EXPO while Hydra is still attacking as he claims that this is his fight. He then knocks down three Hydra bots for Jarvis to shoot them. Jarvis warns Stark that something is up and the street collapses on them. They are about to fall into the water but get out just in time. The Hydra octopus is about to steal the Arc Reactor as Jarvis calls upon more Stark pods. Once they arrive, they go inside and try to take it down from there with Hydra bots trying to defend the Octopus from being blown up. A giant core activates its arm and attempts to attack, but the pods are ready to fire. They fire but are unable to destroy it. Stark finds a weakness and blows it up. Stark and the pods then escape because of the blast. The Octopus explodes and Stark congratulates the guests for being heroes but the power on the guests' vehicle begins to fail and Jarvis begins to fall. Jarvis grapples to Stark who flies them back in the Iron Man Mark 45 armor (from Avengers: Age of Ultron). Iron Man roughly flies the guests back to Disneyland and into the expo. He finally thanks the guests, but before he can do anything else, Dum-E blinds the guests and ends the experience.

The Avengers Campus also includes an interactive "Become Iron Man" experience in Expo Shop, themed merchandise and a character greeting with Iron Man. On 31 March 2019, Ant-Man and the Wasp: Nano Battle! opened in the new S.H.I.E.L.D. Science and Technology Pavilion at the Expo.

See also
 Guardians of the Galaxy – Mission: Breakout!
 Star Tours – The Adventures Continue
Ant-Man and the Wasp: Nano Battle!
Web Slingers: A Spider-Man Adventure

References

Alien invasions in fiction
Amusement rides based on film franchises
Amusement rides introduced in 2017
Hong Kong Disneyland
Hong Kong in fiction
Iron Man in other media
Marvel Comics in amusement parks
Marvel Cinematic Universe amusement rides
Simulator rides
Tomorrowland
Avengers Campus
Audio-Animatronic attractions
Walt Disney Parks and Resorts attractions
2017 establishments in Hong Kong
Iron Man (film series)